The 1982 International cricket season was from May 1982 to August 1982.

Season overview

June

India in England

1982 ICC Trophy

July

Pakistan in England

References

1982 in cricket